The following is a list of deaths due to injuries sustained in boxing. In February 1995, it was estimated that "approximately 500 boxers have died in the ring or as a result of boxing since the Marquess of Queensberry Rules were introduced in 1884." 22 boxers died in 1953 alone.

The list is incomplete; many other boxers not listed here have died as a consequence of injuries sustained in a contest.

References

External links
 Category:Ring Fatalities - BoxRec

Boxing
Boxing
Combat sports controversies